Myobia is a genus of mites that live in the fur of rodents, and contains the following species:
Myobia agraria Gorissen & Lukoschus, 1982 – found on Apodemus agrarius
Myobia annae Haitlinger, 1987 – found on Apodemus mystacinus
Myobia apomyos Uchikawa, OConnor & Klompen, 1991 – found on Apomys littoralis
Myobia malaysiensis Fain, Lukoschus & Nadchatram, 1980
Myobia musculi (Schrank, 1781)
Myobia machadoi Fain, 1972

References

Trombidiformes